Candy and Cigarettes (stylized as CANDY & CIGARETTES) is a Japanese manga series written and illustrated by Tomonori Inoue. It was serialized in Kodansha's seinen manga magazine Young Magazine the 3rd from January 2017 to May 2021.

Publication
Kodansha collected its chapters in eleven tankōbon volumes, released from June 20, 2017, to November 18, 2021.

In December 2021, Seven Seas Entertainment announced that they had licensed the manga for an English release in North America starting in August 2022.

Volume list

See also
Coppelion, another manga series by the same author

References

External links
 

Action anime and manga
Crime in anime and manga
Fiction about assassinations
Kodansha manga
Neo-noir comics
Seinen manga
Seven Seas Entertainment titles
Thriller anime and manga